The Zan languages, or Zanuri or Colchidian, are a branch of the Kartvelian languages constituted by the Mingrelian and Laz languages. The grouping is disputed as some Georgian linguists consider the two to form a dialect continuum of one Zan language. This is often challenged on the most commonly applied criteria of mutual intelligibility when determining borders between languages, as Mingrelian and Laz are only partially mutually intelligible, though speakers of one language can recognize a sizable amount of vocabulary of the other, primarily due to semantic loans, lexical loans and other areal features resulting from geographical proximity and historical close contact common for dialect continuums.

The term Zan comes from the Greco-Roman name of one of the chief Colchian tribes, which is almost identical to the name given to the Mingrelians by the Svans (a northwestern Kartvelian group). Georgian linguist Akaki Shanidze proposed the name "Colchidian" for Zan.

History
According to a glottochronological analysis by G. Klimov, the Zan languages had split from the Common Kartvelian group by about the 8th century BC. Zan  was spoken by a continuous community stretching along the Black Sea coast, from modern day Trabzon, Turkey into western Georgia, also existing in modern-day Giresun and Ordu provinces of Turkey.

In the mid-7th century AD, Zan speakers were split by migration of Georgian-speaking peoples from Iberia (eastern Georgia), driven by the Arabs, who took over the regions of Imereti, Guria, and Adjara.

Separated by geography, and later by politics and religion, northern and southern Zan eventually diverged into Mingrelian and Laz. Since the differentiation was basically complete by early modern times, it is not customary to speak of a unified Zan language today. Presently, Mingrelian is spoken by the Mingrelians primarily in northwestern Georgia (Mingrelia and Abkhazia), whereas Laz is spoken by the Laz people in Turkey (and in a small portion of Adjara, southwestern Georgia).

References

  (see also )
 

Agglutinative languages
Kartvelian languages
Languages of Georgia (country)
Languages of Turkey
Georgian-Zan languages